Patriarch Gregory III may refer to:

 Patriarch Gregory III of Alexandria, Greek Patriarch of Alexandria in 1354–1366
 Gregory III of Constantinople, Ecumenical Patriarch of Constantinople in 1443–1450